Kensuke Shinzaki (新崎 健介 Shinzaki Kensuke, born December 2, 1966) is a Japanese professional wrestler and professional wrestling executive, better known by his ring name, Jinsei Shinzaki (新崎 人生 Shinzaki Jinsei). He is currently signed to the Michinoku Pro Wrestling promotion where he is the promotion's president. He also performs for Michinoku Pro as a wrestler, serving as the sole heavyweight wrestler on the roster. Shinzaki is also known for his appearances with other Japanese promotions such as All Japan Pro Wrestling (AJPW), New Japan Pro-Wrestling (NJPW), and Frontier Martial-Arts Wrestling (FMW). To American fans, Shinzaki is perhaps most known for his stint in the United States based World Wrestling Federation (WWF) from 1994 to 1996 under the ring name Hakushi (白紙).

Professional wrestling career

Universal Lucha Libre (1992–1993)
A former soccer player, Shinzaki trained in amateur wrestling in high school. He first worked as an actor, but he left for professional wrestling after meeting Gran Hamada. Shinzaki trained in the Mexican style of lucha libre before debuting in Hamada's promotion Universal Lucha Libre in 1992, wrestling under a mask and the name of Mongolian Yuga.

Michinoku Pro Wrestling (1993–1994)
In 1993, Shinzaki followed The Great Sasuke to his promotion Michinoku Pro Wrestling, becoming one of its founders. In June 1993, Kensuke unmasked and changed his gimmick, re-debuting as Jinsei Shinzaki ("Jinsei" meaning "life" in Japanese), an aruki henro or Shikoku pilgrim. Under this persona, Shinzaki wrestled in a slow, meditated style, and constantly performed prayers in the ring before every movement. He also came to the arenas in full pilgrimage garments, including white robes and suge-kasa hats, and carried a shakujo staff and a kongo-zue. Jinsei debuted as a silent heel, being introduced by Mr. Yamaguchi as a special member of Super Delfín's heel unit in order to "curse" The Great Sasuke with his prayers. However, after disagreements with them, Shinzaki turned face in 1994 and joined Sasuke and his allies.

In May 1994, Shinzaki wrestled on a World Wrestling Federation tour of Japan. This led to him being offered a contract with the promotion later that year. The promotion was looking for a Japanese wrestler for the roster;  Hayabusa had rejected an offer, choosing to work for Frontier Martial-Arts Wrestling instead, and Shinzaki was given the Japanese wrestler spot.

World Wrestling Federation (1994–1996)

In November 1994, Shinzaki traveled to the United States to wrestle for the World Wrestling Federation (WWF). He wrestled as Hakushi (白紙, "White One"), a derivation of his Michinoku Pro Wrestling persona. This new character resembled Jinsei Shinzaki, but he was characterized by sporting Buddhist shakyo written all over his skin, in a reference to Japanese folk character Hoichi the Earless. He was also accompanied by a facepaint-wearing cultist named Shinja. Initially a heel, his first few matches were highlighted by victories over jobbers which included future star Matt Hardy and midcarders like Aldo Montoya, and 1-2-3 Kid. Hakushi brought the wrestling style of lucharesu to the company, utilizing many aerial maneuvers, and stood out for using many of them to finish his matches as opposed to a single, established finishing move.

Hakushi had a brief alliance with ninja wrestler Kwang, calling themselves collectively "Shogun". After losing a tag team match, Hakushi blamed Kwang and turned on him. Hakushi subsequently  defeated Kwang, in the Shogun team’s breakup and blow-off match. This also happened to be the Kwang’s last appearance. Hakushi then feuded with former WWF Champion Bret Hart, wrestling a number of competitive matches against him. He also participated in a three-way feud with perennial jobber Barry Horowitz and Bodydonna Skip. Horowitz, who lost for years on WWF programming to get over new talent, surprisingly used his three-quarter nelson to secure a victory over Skip. Hakushi would also fall to Horowitz soon after because of interference from Skip. His loss was a surprise to the fans, not only given Horowitz's long time losing record, but also given how well Hakushi did during his feud with Bret Hart in what had been Hakushi's first major feud in the company. Hakushi and Horowitz would briefly form a tag team, leading to a face turn for Hakushi. In Survivor Series, Hakushi was a member of The Underdogs team, but was eliminated after a kick from his enemy 1-2-3 Kid. He also was a competitor in the 1996 Royal Rumble, where he was eliminated by Bret Hart's brother, Owen Hart.

During a match on Raw against Justin "Hawk" Bradshaw on the March 6 episode, Hakushi was hit by Bradshaw's branding iron after a loss. That week on WWF Superstars, commentator Jim Ross reported that he had been so humiliated by the branding that he (kayfabe) left the WWF.

New Japan Pro-Wrestling (1996, 1997)
Upon leaving his stint in WWF, Shinzaki returned to Japan. He made a single night appearance with New Japan Pro-Wrestling at "Battle Formation" on April 29, 1996, where he wrestled The Great Muta. Shinzaki was introduced as a mystic, supernatural character very much like Muta, who embodied evil while Shinzaki embodied good. Shinzaki was defeated in a spirited brawl. One year later on January 4's Wrestling World In Tokyo Dome 1997, he faced and defeated Heisei Ishingun member Michiyoshi Ohara, who had a similar gimmick to his, and mimicked everything Shinzaki did.

Return to Michinoku Pro (1996–1997)

Shinzaki returned to Michinoku Pro Wrestling in October 1996 at the Michinoku Pro 3rd Anniversary event, defeating Hayabusa. Once again aligning himself with The Great Sasuke, Shinzaki was undefeated in singles matches until 1997.

In October 1997, the Hakushi character was brought up to go against WWF's "Dead Man" The Undertaker. Hakushi was now an undead as well due to having been "killed" in his match with Muta, and was introduced in a coffin by an entourage of Japanese traditional pallbearers, showing in his clothes the same blood stains he had got in said match. He faced Undertaker, but was defeated after a Tombstone Piledriver and entombed in the mountains of Tohoku.

Frontier Martial-Arts Wrestling (1997–1998)
In mid-1997, Shinzaki started appearing in Frontier Martial-Arts Wrestling helping Hayabusa in his battles against Mr. Gannosuke. They also had a brief stint in Extreme Championship Wrestling competing against Rob Van Dam and Sabu.

All Japan Pro Wrestling (1998–2002)
Shinzaki and Hayabusa competed in All Japan Pro Wrestling's Real Tag League 1998. In January 1999, they won the All Asia Tag Team Championship from Jun Izumida and Tamon Honda. They retained it until June 1999, when they lost it to Takao Omori and Yoshihiro Takayama. Shinzaki then kept a feud against Mitsuharu Misawa's Untouchables faction, but his appearances in AJPW became more sparse until ceasing in favour of Michinoku Pro in 2002.

In 2001, still as an AJPW representative, Shinzaki made a surprise appearance in New Japan Pro-Wrestling, wearing a white mask and causing Kazunari Murakami's defeat to Keiji Mutoh. Jinsei then unmasked, and Mutoh introduced him as the new member of his personal faction Bad Ass Translate Trading.

Second return to Michinoku Pro (2002–present)
Shinzaki has been the president of Michinoku Pro Wrestling company since 2003 as a result of Sasuke dedicating more of his time to his political career as a member of the Iwate Prefectural (state) Assembly.

Shinzaki is also the co-founder of the joshi promotion Sendai Girls' Pro Wrestling along with joshi wrestler Meiko Satomura.

On April 15, 2011, Shinzaki returned to the United States to wrestle for Chikara in the 2011 King of Trios tournament, where he would represent Michinoku Pro with Dick Togo and the Great Sasuke. In their first round match Team Michinoku Pro defeated Team Minnesota (1-2-3 Kid, Arik Cannon and Darin Corbin). The following day, Team Michinoku Pro defeated Jigsaw, Manami Toyota and Mike Quackenbush to advance to the semifinals of the tournament. On April 17, Team Michinoku Pro was eliminated from the tournament in the semifinal stage by F.I.S.T. (Chuck Taylor, Icarus and Johnny Gargano).

Personal life
Following the 2011 Tōhoku earthquake and tsunami, Shinzaki helped victims in the Tōhoku region by travelling around and providing them with food and drinks. Initial reports falsely noted that Shinzaki himself was living in his car due to losing his home and restaurant. However, this was incorrect as he was really just spending a lot of time traveling to help the needy.

Championships and accomplishments
All Japan Pro Wrestling
All Asia Tag Team Championship (1 time) – with Hayabusa
Michinoku Pro Wrestling
Tohoku Tag Team Championship (5 times, current) – with Último Dragón (1 time), Gaina (2 times), Kesen Numajiro (1 time) and The Great Sasuke (1)
UWA World Tag Team Championship (1 time, current) – with The Great Sasuke
Futaritabi Tag Tournament (1994) – with Super Delfin
Michinoku Trios League (2005) – with The Great Sasuke and Kesen Numajiro
Pro Wrestling Illustrated
Ranked No. 48 of the top 500 singles wrestlers in the PWI 500 in 1995
Ranked No. 209 of the 500 best singles wrestlers during the "PWI Years" in 2003
Tokyo Sports
Newcomer Award (1993)

References

External links 
 
 
 

1966 births
Japanese male professional wrestlers
Living people
Professional wrestling executives
Sportspeople from Tokushima Prefecture
People from Tokushima (city)
20th-century professional wrestlers
21st-century professional wrestlers
All Asia Tag Team Champions
Tohoku Tag Team Champions
UWA World Tag Team Champions